Darrell Anthony Grymes (born December 4, 1961) is a former American football wide receiver who played for the Detroit Lions of the National Football League (NFL). He played college football at Central State University.

References 

1961 births
Living people
American football wide receivers
Central State Marauders football players
Detroit Lions players
Players of American football from Washington, D.C.